Dalseong County (Dalseong-gun) is a gun occupying much of south and western Daegu, South Korea.  A largely rural district lying along the Nakdong River, it makes up nearly half of Daegu's total area.  It is divided in half by a narrow piece of Dalseo-gu that reaches west to the river.

Like the other local government units in South Korea, Dalseong-gun enjoys a moderate degree of local autonomy.  The county magistrate and council are elected by the local citizens, although their authority is sharply curtailed. The seat of government is located in Nongong-eup.  The current magistrate is Lee Jong-jin.

Dalseong-gun enters historical records in 757, as Daegu-hyeon, a subsidiary of Suchang-gun (modern-day Suseong-gu).  Dalseong-gun became part of Daegu Metropolitan City in 1995, as part of a general reform of local governments.

As the near hinterland of Daegu, Dalseong-gun is known as a center of truck farming and tourism.  Landmarks of Dalseong-gun include Biseulsan and the Naengcheon resort area beneath Paljoryeong.

The name Dalseong means "Dal Castle," and comes from the earlier name of Daegu, Dalgubeol.

Administrative divisions

Dalseong-gun is divided into six eup and three myeon.  These are in turn divided into 279 ri and 1470 ban.

Dasa-eup
Hyeonpung-eup
Hwawon-eup
Nongong-eup
Okpo-eup
Yuga-eup
Gachang-myeon
Guji-myeon
Habin-myeon

See also
Geography of South Korea

External links
  Official multilingual website
  2004 Statistical Yearbook

 
Counties of Daegu